Aguacate is the Spanish word for avocado. 

Aguacate may also refer to:

Aguacate, Belize, a village in Toledo District, Belize
Aguacate, Cuba, a former town near Havana, Cuba
 Aguacate, Aguadilla, Puerto Rico, a barrio in the municipality of Aguadilla, Puerto Rico
 Aguacate, Yabucoa, Puerto Rico, a barrio in the municipality of Yabucoa, Puerto Rico